Liborio Mejía Gutiérrez (July 28, 1792 – September 3, 1816) was a Colombian colonel and politician during the struggle for Independence from Spain, and in 1816 Liborio Mejía became president of the United Provinces of the New Granada making him the youngest person to ever hold the presidency of Colombia at the age of 24. He was executed three months later during the Reconquista led by the Spaniard Pablo Morillo.

Early life
Mejía, son of José Antonio Mejía y María Gutiérrez, was born on July 28, 1792, in Rio Negro, in the province of Antioquia, in the Viceroyalty of New Granada in what is now Colombia. He studied in the Colegio Mayor de San Bartolomé between 1808 and 1812 in Santafé de Bogotá. Upon his return to Medellín, he taught philosophy in the Colegio Provincial, in what is now the University of Antioquia. He studied and worked with Francisco José de Caldas on the defense plans for Antioquia from the royalist’s Reconquista.

Since 1813 he got involved in the fight for independence, joining in the army assembled by the colonel José María Gutiérrez. In short time he was made colonel and put in charge of the garrison unit in Popayán.

Political and military life

Facing the resignation of president José Fernández Madrid on June 22, 1816, the Permanent Commission of Congress, then assembled in Popayán, named in his place, general Custodio García Rovira as president of the United Provinces, and colonel Mejía as vice-president. Mejía, however, had to assume the Presidency with the dictatorship powers bestowed to the president by Congress, because García Rovira was unable to assume the presidency at the moment.

His presidency was short lived, he had only time to assemble a War Council in which it was decided to assemble a 600 manned army led by Mejía and head south and face the forces of Juan Sámano. Mejía faced Sámano in the Battle of Cuchilla del Tambo which culminated with the defeat of the patriots on June 29. Mejía escaped to La Plata where he ceded his presidential powers to Custodio García Rovira, thus assuming the vice presidency as first intended.

The Spanish army, this time at the command of Carlos Toirá, caught up to colonel Mejía in La Plata. The battle came to an end on July 10, 1816 resulting on the final defeat for Mejía and the Neogranadines. Mejía was able to escape but a few days later was captured and made prisoner.

Made prisoner of war, he was transferred to Bogotá, where on September 3, 1816, Mejía, was executed for treason under orders of Pablo Morillo and Juan Sámano, along with other founding fathers, who later became known collectively as the Martyrs of Independence. With the defeat of Mejía at Cuchilla del Tambo, the Reconquista was established. Mejía died at the age of 25, single and with no children.

See also
 Custodio García Rovira
 Pablo Morillo

Notes

Presidents of Colombia
Vice presidents of Colombia
1792 births
1816 deaths
People of the Colombian War of Independence
University of Antioquia people